The Nebraska Cornhuskers men's basketball statistical leaders are the individual statistical leaders of the Nebraska Cornhuskers men's basketball program in various categories, including points, assists, blocks, rebounds, and steals. The Cornhuskers compete in NCAA Division I, representing the University of Nebraska–Lincoln in the Big Ten.

Although Nebraska began competing in intercollegiate men's basketball in 1896, the school's official record book does not generally list records from before the 1950s, as earlier records are incomplete and inconsistent. As scoring was much lower and teams played fewer games in a typical season, it is unlikely that players from this era would appear on these lists anyway.

While NCAA did not officially record assists until 1983–84, and blocks and steals until 1985–86, Nebraska's record books include these stats from prior seasons. These lists are updated through the end of the 2021–22 season.

Scoring

Rebounds

Assists

Steals

Blocks

References

Nebraska Cornhuskers
Statistical